Rock is the name of some places in the U.S. state of Wisconsin:

Rock, Rock County, Wisconsin
Rock, Wood County, Wisconsin